"Face My Fears" is a song by Japanese-American singer-songwriter Hikaru Utada and American record producer Skrillex, released on January 18, 2019, by Epic Records Japan. Along with its English-language counterpart, it serves as the opening theme song to the Square Enix video game Kingdom Hearts III. It was written as a collaboration between Utada, producer Skrillex, and R&B songwriter Poo Bear.

The song was released in both English and Japanese versions, alongside "Chikai" (which was previously released in their seventh Japanese album Hatsukoi) and its English counterpart, "Don't Think Twice", as a CD single on January 18, 2019, making it their first release on the format in eleven years since their 2008 single "Prisoner of Love". It is also their first release with original English songs since "This Is the One" in 2009.

Composition
Utada requested that the producer Skrillex produce a remix of the song "Chikai" for Kingdom Hearts III, since it was known that he was a fan of the game. He proposed to instead make a completely new song. Utada agreed to collaborate with him and songwriter Poo Bear to write the song.

The song was written in the same key as "Passion", to make it easier for Skrillex to mix both songs during his concerts. The song also has the same chords as "Dearly Beloved", the recurring musical theme for the main menu in the Kingdom Hearts series.

Commercial performance
The song topped China's Kugou New Song chart and 8 digital download services in Japan.

In Japan, the single debuted at the sixth spot of the Oricon Weekly Singles chart with 12,732 copies sold on its first week of release, as well as debuting at number three of the Oricon Combined Singles chart with 33,462 equivalent units. Moreover, The Japanese version of "Face My Fears" debuted at the fourth spot of the Oricon Weekly Digital Singles chart with 14,686 downloads.

The song debuted at number 98 on the Billboard Hot 100 on the week dated February 2, 2019, giving Utada their first Hot 100 entry. The song sold 10,000 pure downloads and had 2.5 million streams in the first week in the US.

Track listing

Personnel 
Credits adapted from Youtube Music

 Hikaru Utada - associated performer (track 1 and 3)
 Skrillex - associated performer (track 1 and 3)
 Chris Dave - drums (all tracks)
 Jason "Poo Bear" Boyd - arranger (track 1 and 3), composer (track 1 and 3), lyricist (track 1 and 3), producer (track 1 and 3)
 Jodi Milliner - bass (all tracks)
 Reuben James - piano (track 1 and 3)
 Steve Fitzmaurice - recording engineer (all tracks)
 Masahito Komori - vocal engineer (all track)
 Tom Norris - mixing engineer (track 1), programmer (track 1)
 Ben Parker - guitar (tracks 2, 4)
 Simon Hale - conductor (tracks 2, 4), piano (tracks 2, 4), strings (tracks 2, 4)
 Perry Montague-Mason - strings (tracks 2, 4)
 Darren Heelis - programmer (tracks 2, 4), recording engineer (tracks 2, 4)
 Bob Ludwig - mastering engineer (all tracks)

Charts

Weekly charts

Year-end charts

Release history

References

2019 singles
Hikaru Utada songs
Kingdom Hearts songs
Songs written by Hikaru Utada
Songs written by Skrillex
Songs written by Poo Bear
Future bass songs
Video game theme songs
2019 songs